The Jones House, on Louisiana Highway 154 along Cane River Lake near Melrose in Natchitoches Parish, Louisiana, was built in 1847.  It was listed on the National Register of Historic Places in 1993.

Its NRHP nomination states:The Jones House helps establish the significance of Natchitoches Parish as a center of the Creole style. It is particularly important for its three elegant mantel/overmantel ensembles, a feature found in only the most elegant and "upmarket" Creole houses in Louisiana. In this, it is in sharp contrast to the general trend in Natchitoches Parish of large, plain Creole houses with little in the way of intricate ornamentation. It is one of only two houses having mantel/overmantel ensembles. (The other is Melrose Plantation House, a National Historic Landmark.) Finally, it is the only known surviving house to have the lozenge shaped design so popular in Louisiana's French Creole architecture.

References

Creole architecture in Louisiana
Houses on the National Register of Historic Places in Louisiana
Houses completed in 1847
Natchitoches Parish, Louisiana